Drangsnes (regionally also ) is a small town in the western part of Iceland, at the mouth of Steingrímsfjörður and near Hólmavík.

It is part of the Kaldrananeshreppur municipality and only has 67 inhabitants (2011 census). It got its name from a tall rock named Kerling of what is said that it is one of three troll women who tried to separate the Westfjords from the rest of Iceland.

References

External links
Official website 

Populated places in Westfjords